John Bjorn "J.B." Gislason (born December 6, 1872) was an American farmer and politician.

He was born in Iceland and emigrated with his parents to the United States in 1879 and settled in Lyon County, Minnesota. He eventually lived in Minneota, Minnesota and was a farmer. Gislason served as the township clerk for Westerheim Township, Lyon County, Minnesota. He also served on the school board and was the school board clerk. Gislason was involved with the Southern Minnesota Betterment Development League and the Lyon County Agricultural Association. Gislason served in the Minnesota House of Representatives from 1919 to 1926.

Gislason died on December 4, 1960 aged 87.

Notes

External links

1872 births
1960 deaths
Icelandic emigrants to the United States
People from Minneota, Minnesota
Farmers from Minnesota
School board members in Minnesota
Members of the Minnesota House of Representatives